The Sudirman Cup is an international badminton mixed team competition contested by member countries of the Badminton World Federation (BWF), the sport's global governing body. The championship has been awarded every two years since the inaugural tournament in 1989. It used to be held at the same venue for the World Championships in the same year until the International Badminton Federation (now the BWF) decided to split the two tournaments starting from 2003. There are five matches in every Sudirman Cup tie which consists of men and women's singles, men and women's doubles and mixed doubles. The cup is named after Dick Sudirman, a former Indonesian badminton player and the founder of the Badminton Association of Indonesia (PBSI). The current champion is China, which won its 12th title at the 2021 tournament in Finland.

There is no prize money in Sudirman Cup; players play for their respective countries and to earn BWF World Ranking points and national prestige.

Trophy
The Sudirman Cup stands 80 cm high. It is made of 22 carat (92%) gold-plated solid silver and stands on an octagonal base made of jati wood (Java teak wood). The body of the Cup is in the form of a shuttlecock and is surmounted by a replica of the Borobudur Temple. The handles are in the shape of stamens, symbolising the seeds of badminton.

The Cup was made by Masterix Bandung Company at the price of US$15,000.

Format
The Sudirman Cup is an international competition that does not stage a qualification round. The competing teams are divided into 7 groups based on their performances. Only teams in Group 1 will have a chance to lift the trophy as the teams in other groups fight for promotion. Only six teams compete in Group 1 until 2003 before it is increased to 8 in 2005 and later to 12 teams in 2011. Compare to the format used previously, in 2021  a new format will be used, 16 teams will be contested, which qualified from Continental mixed team championship and mixed team ranking. As usual the competition starts with a group stage followed by a knockout stage. 

Originally, the teams who finish last in the group were relegated to the lower group for the next edition, except the final group. The promotion-relegation system was last used in 2009, and teams competing are now grouped by world rankings.

Result

Successful national teams
Indonesia initially won the tournament in 1989. Throughout the history of the tournament, eight countries have reached through to the semifinal round in all tournaments of Sudirman Cup: China, Denmark, England, Indonesia, Korea, Malaysia, Thailand and Japan.

China is the most successful national team in the Sudirman Cup (12 victories), followed by Korea (4 victories) and Indonesia (1 victory). The tournament has never been won by a non-Asian country, Denmark is the only European country that came close to winning it, in 1999 and 2011.

References

External links 
Official website

 
International badminton competitions
World cups
Recurring sporting events established in 1989